Percy Addleshaw (1866 in Bowdon, Cheshire – 1916) was an English barrister and writer.

A graduate of Christ Church, Oxford, Addleshaw was called to the bar in 1893. He was an admirer and friend of Roden Noel. He wrote articles, poems and reviews for various publications and, under the pseudonym of Percy Hemingway published Out of Egypt, a volume of short stories (1894) and The Happy Wanderer and other Poems (1895).

References

Further reading
 A Victorian Anthology, Houghton, Mifflin and Company (1895)

External links

 
 

English male journalists
1866 births
1916 deaths
Alumni of Christ Church, Oxford
English male short story writers
English short story writers
English male poets